Country Hall Liège (formerly Country Hall du Sart Tilman) is a multi-purpose arena in Liège, Belgium. The arena has 5,600 seats in its sport configuration and 7,200 in the concert configuration. It hosts indoor sporting events as well as concerts.

Events
Notable sporting events hosted by the arena include the 1973 European champions cup final in which Ignis Varese defeated CSKA Moscow 71–66, and the 1977 European basketball championship. The arena is the regular home venue of Belgacom Liège Basket who competes in the Basketball League Belgium.

See also
 List of indoor arenas in Belgium

References

External links

  

Basketball venues in Belgium
Indoor arenas in Belgium
Sports venues in Liège Province
Sport in Liège
Culture in Liège
Buildings and structures in Liège